Mislea may refer to several villages in Romania:

 Mislea, a village in Cobia Commune, Dâmbovița County
 Mislea, a village in Scorțeni Commune, Prahova County